Melam Suryanarayana (1946–1992) alias Pedda Shavukaru is one of the Senior leaders of Indian National Congress.

Political life 
Melam Suryanarayana first served as the Sarpanch of Perupalem. Later competed for Narasapur legislative assembly constituency in 1985, lost the election to Chegondi Venkata Harirama Jogaiah securing 28,358 votes(31.46%).

Legacy 
After the death of Melam Suryanarayana in 19-10-1992, two statues were erected in the village, one life size and other half size. 
After the death of his brother Melam Balaramkrishna in 24-11-2009, the half size statues of Melam Balaramakrishna and Melam Suryanarayana were Erected and another statue of Melam Balaramakrishna was erected near the Durgamma temple of the Village.

References 

Indian National Congress politicians from Andhra Pradesh
1946 births
1992 deaths